William Thomas Henley (1814–1882) was a pioneer in the manufacture of telegraph cables. He was working as a porter in Cheapside in 1830, leaving after disputes with his employer, and working at the St Katherine Docks for six years. During those years he was determined to learn a trade and used money from an aunt to purchase a lathe, vice and lumber with which he made a work bench. With those tools he taught himself to turn wood and brass and began to experiment, including with electricity.

Henley designed and built a machine in 1837 for covering wires with silk or cotton thread which is now in the London Science Museum (Object Number: 1939-139). The machine may have been Henley's original prototype. Around 1858 Henley developed a needle galvanometer that was installed at the Valentia Island, Ireland shore end of the 1858 transatlantic telegraph cable to receive the first signal from the North American terminus at Heart's Content Cable Station, Newfoundland. That instrument is also in the collection of the museum.

He set up as a submarine cable maker in 1857 and by 1859 he had his own factory beside the Thames at North Woolwich. Cable cores, the electrical component and its insulation, were obtained from Stephen William Silver and Hugh Adams Silver's India Rubber, Gutta Percha and Telegraph Works Company or William Hooper's company. He went on to manufacture the shore ends of the second Transatlantic cable in 1865. The firm eventually extended operations to manufacturing gutta-percha and rubber core as well as cable laying and repair.

W.T. Henley's Telegraph Works Co., Ltd acquired cable ships for cables it would lay as well as manufacture. La Plata foundered en route to complete the lay on 29 November 1874 in the Bay of Biscay with loss of 58 crew and the cable.

W. T. Henley Ltd. was acquired by AEI in 1959, and later became part of GEC following its takeover of AEI in 1967. The company was sold to TT electronics in 1997. Today the company is a division of SICAME UK Limited and relocated to a brand new factory at Hoo (near Rochester) in July 2018.

Footnotes

References

Dictionary of National Biography, Henley, William Thomas (1813?–1882), telegraphic engineer, by Gordon Goodwin. Published 1891.

External links
W.T. Henley Archives (Telegraph Museum Porthcurno and Science Museum Archive and Library at Wroughton)
W. T. Henley's Telegraph Works advertisement listing cables manufactured (ca. 1897)
W.T. Henley’s Telegraph Cable Works, 1912
Machine used for covering wires with silk and cotton, 1837 (Science Museum Group)
CS La Plata Henley's cable ship foundered 29 November 1874 with the loss of 58 crew
The Loss of the La Plata (The Telegraphic Journal, 15 December 1874)

1814 births
1882 deaths
British electrical engineers
Cable manufacture in London
Telegraph engineers and inventors
Burials at Kensal Green Cemetery
History of science and technology in the United Kingdom